Grassrootz Bookstore (also Grassrootz Books or simply Grassrootz) is a bookstore located in Phoenix near the downtown area. Grassrootz book selection mainly specializes in African-American literature, history, and culture in the United States. Inside the bookstore is a Juice bar and coffee shop inside as well as a collaborative workspace for the community. Grassrootz is Phoenix’s only Black-owned bookstore.

History 

Grassrootz officially opened On July 4, 2019, the store started in a hallway within the Afri-soul marketplace, originally all the books had were from the founders house. The current building space started renovation in 2019, which spanned over a month but completed to open the same year. Subsequently grassrootz saw a second opening on November the following year due to the COVID-19 pandemic business closures.

Name 

The name "Grassrootz" comes from their mission and efforts to formulate independence and positivity in the Black Phoenix community.

Rentals and Online Orders 

Grassrootz has an in-store community library with flexible extensions and the ability to borrow a book for 30 days for only five dollars. They also accept online orders.

Notable Guest 

On May 17, 2021, Grassrootz Bookstore was visited by Phoenix's vice mayor Carlos Garcia.

References

External links 

 
 
 

American companies established in 2019
Book selling websites
Bookstores established in the 20th century
Bookstores of the United States
Independent bookstores of the United States